Professor Kosta Vujic's Hat is a 2012 Serbian film directed by Zdravko Šotra. The film was based on a novel written by Milovan Vitezović.

Plot 
The protagonist of the film is professor Kosta Vujić who in the mid-19th century taught an extraordinarily talented generation of gymnasium students, some of whom would go on to become prominent members of the Serbian society and eventually historically significant figures.

Cast 
 Aleksandar Berček - Professor Kosta Vujić
 Miloš Biković - Mihailo Petrović Alas
  - Milorad Mitrović 
  - Jovan Cvijić
 Andrija Daničić - Jakov Jaša Prodanović
 Mateja Popović - Pavle Popović
 Branimir Brstina - Pofessor Zečević
 Vojin Ćetković - Principal Kozarac
 Dragan Jovanović - Professor Stanić
 Tamara Aleksić - Mirjana Marinković
 Marko Bacović - Minister Marinković
 Ivan Bosiljčić - Professor Mokranjac
 Vesna Čipčić - Minister's wife
 Dragomir Čumić - Old principal Milosavljević
 Nikola Ranđelović - Ljubomir Stojanović
 Igor Đorđević - Captain Mišić

References

External links 
 

2012 comedy films
2012 films
Films with screenplays by Milovan Vitezović
Serbian comedy films
Films set in Belgrade
History of Serbia on film
Films shot in Belgrade
Cultural depictions of Serbian men
Films directed by Zdravko Šotra